The Western Sahara national football team represents Western Sahara (SADR), a disputed territory, in association football. Controlled by the Sahrawi Football Federation, they are members of ConIFA for non-FIFA-affiliated nations.

History

Origins (1984–2003)
Many teams have represented Western Sahara, or the Sahrawi Arab Democratic Republic (SADR), in unofficial matches. The first known games were played against Algerian league teams in 1984, before the creation of the Sahrawi Football Federation. In 1986, 1987 and 1994, friendly matches were played against Algerian, Spanish and Italian league teams. In 1988, a Sahrawi Republic team played with Le Mans UC 72 in France, losing 3–2. On 27 February 2001, during the 25th anniversary of the proclamation of the SADR, a match was played in the Sahrawi refugee camps in Tindouf, Algeria between a Sahrawi Republic team and a Basque Country veterans team. The match was attended by more than 4,000 fans, and was abandoned during the second half owing to the temperature (38 °C) with the score at 2–2.

NF-Board membership and foundation (2003–2012)
On 12 December 2003, the Sahrawi Football Federation became provisionally affiliated to the Nouvelle Fédération Board. In 2007, a team representing Western Sahara beat Macau 1–0. On 23 December 2011, a mixed-sex team from the Spanish region of Galicia beat a team composed of members of the Sahrawi diaspora in Spain 2–1, in a match played in Teo that was attended by 1,500 fans. On 5 December 2009, three Sahrawi representatives participated in the 6th General Assembly of the N.F.-Board in Paris, France.

On 25 March 2012, Mohamed Moulud Mohamed Fadel, SADR Minister for Youth and Sports, announced the official creation of the Sahrawi national football team.

2012 VIVA World Cup
The Sahrawi national football team made its official international début at the inauguration match of the 5th VIVA World Cup, playing against the host team, Kurdistan at the Franso Hariri Stadium in Arbil, Iraq on 4 June 2012. The Dromedaries lost 6–0 to the team which went on to win the tournament. Their next match was against Occitania, a 6–2 defeat, and the team finished in third position in Group A.
The next match was a play-off against Darfur, and ended in a 5–1 victory, Sahrawi's first official international victory. They beat Raetia 3–0 before losing the fifth place match 3–1 to Occitania.

The Sahrawi national football team and federation had to face a deal made between the Kurdistan Regional Government and the Government of Morocco, which consisted of avoiding the display of the SADR flag during ceremonies and matches of the VIVA tournament. Despite this, the SADR team managed to arrange extraofficial deals with all their rivals to fly the Sahrawi flag wave on the stadiums where they played their matches.

ConIFA and Zamenhof Cup (2012–2020)
On 31 July 2015, the Sahrawi team beat the Esperanto Team by 4–0 at the Stadium Lille Métropole. The match was part of the Zamenhof Cup, event made during the 100th World Esperanto Congress.

On 13 April 2018, the ConIFA announces the death of El-Mahfoud Welad, the goalkeeper of the Western Sahara national team, who was killed during the 2018 Algerian Air Force Il-76 crash.

In 2020, Western Sahara would participate in the 2020 CONIFA World Football Cup, but due to logistical problems, they withdrew from playing in the competition. The competition would later be canceled due to the COVID-19 pandemic.

Present (2020–present)
In June 2020, Western Sahara joined the World Unity Football Alliance.

Selected internationals

Key to matches
 Att. = Match attendance
 (H) = Home ground
 (A) = Away ground
 (N) = Neutral ground

Key to record by opponent
 Pld = Games played
 W = Games won
 D = Games drawn
 L = Games lost
 GF = Goals for
 GA = Goals against

Notes

All-time record against other nations
As of 6 August 2022 after the match against  ESM Gonfreville

Notable players

  Sahia Ahmed Budah – national team top scorer

Player records
As of 20 February 2019
Players in bold are still active with Western Sahara.

Top goalscorers

Managers

 Sidahmed Erguibi Ahmed Baba Haiai (2010–2017)
 Mohandi Abdalahi (2018–present)

Competitive record

World tournaments

National stadium 
Stade Sheikh Mohamed Laghdaf in Laayoune seats 15,000

References

External links
 Sahrawi national football team Official Facebook Page
 Sahrawi national football team on Fedefutbol.net

CONIFA member associations
African N.F.-Board teams
Football in Western Sahara
2012 establishments in Western Sahara